Alan Naniyev (born  in Severnaya Osetiya-Alaniya Respublika, Russia) is a Russian born Azerbaijani male weightlifter, competing in the 105 kg category and representing Azerbaijan at international competitions. He participated at the 2004 Summer Olympics in the 105 kg event. He competed at world championships, most recently at the 2006 World Weightlifting Championships.

Major results

References

External links
 

1978 births
Living people
Azerbaijani male weightlifters
Weightlifters at the 2004 Summer Olympics
Olympic weightlifters of Azerbaijan
Place of birth missing (living people)
People from North Ossetia–Alania